Lohian Khas Junction (station code: LNK) is located in Jalandhar district in the Indian state of Punjab and serves Lohian Khas town. Lohian Khas station falls under Firozpur railway division of Northern Railway zone of Indian Railways.

Overview 
This station is located on the single track,  broad gauge, Jalandhar–Firozpur line and Lohian Khas–Phillaur line.

Electrification 
Lohian Khas railway station is situated on single track DMU Jalandhar–Firozpur line and single track DMU Lohian Khas–Nakodar line. It was reported in Feb 2018 that the electrification of the single track BG Jalandhar–Firozpur line and the Lohian Khas–Nakodar line was in pipeline and union railways had budgeted funds for the same.

Amenities 
Lohian Khas railway station has 1 booking window, no separate enquiry office and just very basic amenities like drinking water, public toilets, sheltered area with adequate seating. The station had small footfall of 989 persons per day in 2018. Wheelchair availability is there for disabled persons. There are three platforms at the station and one foot over bridge (FOB).

References

External links 

 Pictures of Lohian Khas Junction railway station

Railway stations in Jalandhar district
Firozpur railway division